The Coal Authority is a non-departmental public body of the United Kingdom government sponsored by the Department for Energy Security and Net Zero (DESNZ). On behalf of the country, it owns the vast majority of unworked coal in Great Britain, as well as former coal mines, and undertakes a range of functions including:

 licensing coal mining operations
 matters with respect to coal mining subsidence damage outside the areas of responsibility of coal mining licensees
 dealing with property and historical liability issues; for example environmental projects, mine water treatment schemes and surface hazards relating to past coal mining
 providing public access to information held by the Coal Authority on coal mining

Purpose
The Coal Authority’s stated purpose is to:
 keep people safe and provide peace of mind 
 protect and enhance the environment 
 use its information and expertise to help people make informed decisions 
 create value and minimise cost to the taxpayer

The Coal Authority provides services to other government departments and agencies, local governments and commercial partners, while contributing to the delivery of the government’s Industrial Strategy and the 25-year Environment Plan.

As a public body that holds significant geospatial data it is also working with the Geospatial Commission to look at how, by working together, it can unlock significant value across the economy.

As part of the Coal Authority's duty to protect the public and the environment, it operates a 24-hour telephone line for reporting coal mine hazards and operates 82 mine water treatment schemes across the UK, cleaning more than 122 billion litres of mine water every year.

Governance and strategy

The Coal Authority has an independent board responsible for setting its strategic direction, policies and priorities, while ensuring its statutory duties are carried out effectively.
Non-executive directors are recruited and appointed to the board by the Secretary of State for DESNZ. Executive directors are recruited to their posts by the board and appointed to the board by the Secretary of State for DESNZ.

History
It was established under the Coal Industry Act 1994 to manage some functions, in which the British Coal Corporation (formerly the National Coal Board) had previously undertaken, including ownership of unworked coal.

The Coal Authority's public task comprises all the functions, duties and responsibilities is set out in the following documents

 The Coal Industry Act 1994 ("the 1994 Act")
 The Coal Mining Subsidence Act 1991, as amended by the 1994 Act
 A Revised Coal Authority Explanatory Note, produced by the Department of Trade and Industry (DTI) for Parliament in June 1994 to explain the intended provisions of the Coal Industry Bill
 The Water Act 2003
 The Water Environment and Water Services (Scotland) Act 2003
 Statement by Lord Strathclyde in 1994 on the government's expectations of the Coal Authority relating to mine water remediation
 Re-statement by John Battle MP in 1998 that the Coal Authority is the designated body with responsibility for dealing with mine water discharges from former coal mines
 The Energy Act 2011

Its headquarters are in Mansfield, Nottinghamshire, where its Mining Heritage Centre is also based. This archive houses a large quantity of data, including historical information, relating to coal mining in Britain.

The unique collection of around 120,000 coal abandonment plans, covering both opencast and deep mining operations, dates as far back as the 17th century and depict areas of extraction and the point of entry into the same.

Historical mine plans can be accessed for research purposes, for desktop studies prior to development or simply by members of the public with an interest in the history of mining.

The Coal Authority also has a large collection of more than 47,000 British Coal photographs, which feature a wide range of collieries and cover every aspect of coal mining.

All plans and photographs have been digitally scanned and are available to any interested parties. They can be viewed at the Mining Heritage Centre in Mansfield.

The Water and Abandoned Metal Mines (WAMM) programme
To tackle the water pollution caused by historical metal mining in England, the Coal Authority works with the Environment Agency in the Water and Abandoned Metal Mines partnership, funded by the Department for Environment, Food and Rural Affairs (Defra).

Mining reports

The Coal Authority’s Commercial Reports and Advisory Services provides comprehensive mining report services, include desktop reports, pre planning advice, project management and civil, structural and environmental engineering. Reports available from the Coal Authority include:

 CON29M Coal mining report – an official coal mining report for the conveyancing industry
 Ground Stability report – a CON29M report, combined with non-coal related British Geological Survey subsidence information
 Enviro All-in-One report – a CON29M report, combined with Groundsure’s homebuyers environmental report
 No Search Certificate – a certificate to show that a property is not within a known area of past, present or proposed future mining activity

Mine energy and heat

Abandoned coal mines are a source of geothermal energy, and could also be used for cooling and storing inter-seasonally waste or renewable energy.

As mines become flooded they have the potential to meet all of the heating needs of the coalfield communities which account for 25% of UK population. In the case of a district heating network, this energy can be transferred to a pipe network using a heat exchanger, and then distributed to nearby homes.

Abandoned coal mines present an opportunity to the UK as a source of geothermal energy, and this is being explored by the Coal Authority, which is working in partnerships with local authorities and other companies to fulfil this potential.

Consultancy services

The Coal Authority provides consultancy services on:

Geothermal energy from abandoned coal mines
 Geothermal energy from abandoned coal mines is a low carbon, sustainable heat source which under the right conditions can compete with public supply gas prices.
Coal mining risk assessments
 When submitting a planning application within a high risk area, it is likely a Coal Mining Risk Assessment will need to be submitted.
Mine water treatment schemes
 It provides expert advice and assistance to help developers understand and investigate the risks of past mining.
Tip inspection and management
 It has expertise in the long term management of the risks associated with tips and delivering inspection programmes to mitigate these risks.
Water level monitoring
 The Coal Authority has significant experience gained in monitoring an extensive mine water treatment scheme portfolio
Engineering design
 It has a team experienced in engineering design, with many years of providing the critical information required to complete complex civil engineering projects.
Borehole drilling advice
 The complex nature of mine workings can cause operational issues when drilling boreholes, which requires specialist knowledge to be carried out accurately.
Mining hydrogeology
 It has a team of hydrogeologists with a wide range of experience in all types of hydrogeology, specialising in complex mining hydrogeology.

See also
 Coal mining in the United Kingdom

Sources

References

External links
 
 Coal Industry Act 1994

Coal mining in the United Kingdom
Coal organizations
Department of Energy and Climate Change
Mansfield
Non-departmental public bodies of the United Kingdom government
Organisations based in Nottinghamshire
Organizations established in 1994
1994 establishments in the United Kingdom